Alexander Loginov may refer to:

Alexander Loginov (biathlon), a Russian biathlete.
Alexander Loginov (ice hockey), a Russian ice hockey player.